Snapping scapula syndrome, also known as scapulocostal syndrome or scapulothoracic syndrome, is described by a "grating, grinding, popping or snapping sensation of the scapula onto the back side of the ribs or thoracic area of the spine" (Hauser).  Disruption of the normal scapulothoracic mechanics causes this problem.  The most common cases are found in young, active patients who tend to excessively use the overhead or throwing motion.

Cause
One source of snapping scapula is when the muscles underneath the scapula (the subscapularis muscle) atrophies.  This causes the scapula to become very close to the rib cage, eventually causing rubbing or bumping during arm/shoulder movement.  Another cause is bursitis, which is when the tissues between the shoulder blade and thoracic wall inflame.  Muscle and bone abnormalities in the shoulder area can also contribute to the pain.

Diagnosis

Treatment

Non-Surgical
Doctors often recommend physical therapy in order to strengthen the subscapularis muscle, and prescribe anti-inflammatory medications.   For extreme cases, cortisone injections would be utilized.

Surgical
Surgery is usually only used if the non-surgical treatments have failed. Bone abnormalities may need surgical attention. The most common surgery for snapping scapula requires the surgeon to "take out a small piece of the upper corner of the scapula nearest to the spine."

References 
 Hauser, Ross. "Snapping Scapula Syndrome." Prolotherapy Information . N.p., n.d. Web. 5 Dec 2011.
 Kuhne, M, N Boniquit, N Ghodadra, AA Romeo, and MT Provcher. "The snapping scapula: diagnosis and treatment." PubMed. National Center for Biotechnology Information, 25 Nov 2009. Web. 5 Dec 2011.

External links
 Snapping scapula syndrome: diagnosis and management National Center for Biotechnology Information

Skeletal disorders
Syndromes